Orchidantha is a genus of flowering plants. In the APG III system, it is placed in the family Lowiaceae, as the sole genus. It includes the plants in the formerly recognised genera Lowia and Protamomum.

Orchidantha remains a poorly known genus, found from southern China to Borneo. Orchidantha means "orchid-flower", as one of the petals on the flowers is modified into a labellum, like the flowers of orchids. One species, Orchidantha inouei of Borneo, imitates the smell of dung in order to attract small Onthophagus dung beetles as pollinators.

Taxonomy

Species

, the World Checklist of Selected Plant Families accepted 17 species:

References

Bibliography

External links

Zingiberales
Zingiberales genera
Taxa named by N. E. Brown